Mat Hames is an Emmy-Winning American independent filmmaker known for the PBS and Prime Video documentary series Power Trip: the Story of Energy, as well as his Independent Lens documentaries When I Rise and What Was Ours. He was knighted by King Albert II for his documentary film about Belgian Resistance escape lines in World War II Last Best Hope. He directed the Rooster Teeth RTDocs Series including Common Ground, Waiting for the Punchline, Why We're Here: 15 Years of Rooster Teeth, The Meme Machine, and Connected. His films have been part of the Emmy-Winning U.S. PBS series Independent Lens, SundanceTV, and Amazon Prime. He is a founder of Austin documentary production company Alpheus Media. Alpheus Media, Inc. has also created advertising campaigns for clients including Johns Hopkins, as well as films for the Atlantic Magazine, museums, non-profits, healthcare organizations and Global NGOs. A portion of their interviews with more than 250 cancer survivors appear on the Livestrong web site, and in a best selling book,  Live Strong.

External links
 Alpheus Media
 Connected
 What Was Ours
 Indiewire Film Review: World's Greatest Head Massage
 Fighting Goliath: Texas Coal Wars
 When I Rise
 When I Rise - PBS Site
 Last Best Hope
 

1971 births
Living people
21st-century American businesspeople